Sit Still, Look Pretty is the debut studio album by American singer Daya. It was released on October 7, 2016, through Z Entertainment, Artbeatz, and RED Distribution. All of the songs from her EP, Daya, are included on the album.

Singles
"Hide Away" was released as the lead single from the album on April 22, 2015. Since its release, it has peaked at number 23 on the Billboard Hot 100, and has been certified Platinum by the RIAA.

"Sit Still, Look Pretty" was released to Top 40 radio as the second single from the album on September 4, 2015. It has since peaked at number 28 on the Hot 100, and has been certified Platinum by the RIAA.

"Words" was released to Top 40 radio as the third single from the album on November 15, 2016.

Promotional single
"Cool" was released as the first and only promotional single on September 29, 2016. This song received positive feedback from critics and fans alike.

Critical reception

Upon release, Sit Still, Look Pretty received mixed reviews from critics. Writing for Rolling Stone, Brittany Spanos described the album as being "not especially unique", but noted that Daya's performance on the lead single, as well has her collaboration with The Chainsmokers on "Don't Let Me Down", "made her a surprisingly soulful leader of a new kind of bubblegum". In a more positive review, AllMusic gave the album a three and a half star rating, writing that the LP "offers a fun and youthful alternative to the smokier shades of the post-Lorde alt-pop landscape".

Track listing

Charts

Certifications

References

2016 debut albums
Sony Music albums
Daya (singer) albums